Changqi may refer to:
Changqi, Hongjiang (长碛村), a village in Longtian Township, Hongjiang City, Hunan, China
Changqi, Guizhou (长碛村), village in Xinjian Township, Fenggang County, Zunyi City, Guizhou, China
Changqi, Guangzhou (长岐镇), town in Huazhou, Maoming, Guangzhou, China; see List of township-level divisions of Guangdong#Huazhou
Ying Changqi (1917–1997), Taiwanese industrialist and Go promoter
Chang Qi, a fictional character in Chapter 67 of the Romance of the Three Kingdoms
Changqi Cup, Chinese Go tournament

See also
Janggi (also spelled changgi), Korean board game
Jangji-dong, a neighbourhood of Seoul
Changji (disambiguation)
Nagasaki, a Japanese city